James Montague ( – 20 July 1618) was an English bishop.

Life
He was the son of Sir Edward Montagu of Boughton and Elizabeth Harington, and grandson of Edward Montagu.

He was a graduate of Christ's College, Cambridge, and became in 1596 the first Master of Sidney Sussex College, Cambridge, for which he laid the foundation stone. He was connected to Frances Sidney, founder of the college, his great-aunt: his maternal grandmother was her sister Lucy Sidney. From that time he was a patron of Thomas Gataker. In 1603 he became Dean of the Chapel Royal. Montague was both a courtier and a Calvinist, and closer to the king than George Abbot, Archbishop of Canterbury; he is considered to have influenced James I against the Arminians. With the other courtiers Sir Robert Darcy and John Harington, 1st Baron Harington of Exton, Montague introduced to court circles, and especially those around Henry Frederick, Prince of Wales, the Puritan Arthur Hildersham, and the radical religious figures Henry Jacob and John Burges.

He edited the collected works of James I; it has been said that his introductions "push the art of panegyric close to deification". He had worked with James on An Apologie for the Oath of Allegiance in 1607, at Royston and Newmarket, reading to James the four volumes of the works of Cardinal Bellarmine.

He was Dean of Lichfield from July 1603 until he became Dean of Worcester on 20 December 1604. Montague was elected Bishop of Bath and Wells on 29 March 1608, his election was confirmed on 15 April and he was enthroned and installed at Wells Cathedral on 14 May 1608; he was translated to become Bishop of Winchester on 3 July 1616. At Bath and Wells, he contributed to the legend of the Holy Thorn of Glastonbury, in an entertainment for Anne of Denmark, when the character of Joseph of Arimathea presented boughs to the Queen. He is buried in an alabaster tomb in Bath Abbey.

References

Sources

Bishops of Bath and Wells
Bishops of Winchester
Deans of Lichfield
Deans of Worcester
Alumni of Christ's College, Cambridge
Masters of Sidney Sussex College, Cambridge
1568 births
1618 deaths
17th-century English clergy
James